Trinity Rain Moyer-Rodman (born May 20, 2002) is an American professional soccer player who plays as a forward for Washington Spirit of the National Women's Soccer League (NWSL) and the United States women's national soccer team. At age 18, she became the youngest drafted player in NWSL history after being selected second in the 2021 NWSL College Draft. Rodman earned NWSL Rookie of the Year, NWSL Best XI, and U.S. Soccer Young Female Player of the Year honors following her first season in 2021. , she is the highest paid player in the league.

Early life 
Trinity Rodman was born on May 20, 2002, the daughter of Michelle Moyer and former professional basketball player Dennis Rodman. She and her brother, DJ Rodman, were raised primarily by their mother. She is the half-sister of Alexis Rodman.

She began playing soccer at age four and said soccer "felt like home" to her as young as seven or eight. She was encouraged by her mother and sister to pursue her dream of becoming a professional soccer player.

Early club and college soccer
Rodman began playing soccer with SoCal Blues at the age of ten. She won four national championships in the Elite Clubs National League (ECNL) and Rodman's team maintained a five-year undefeated streak.  Rodman attended and played for Corona del Mar High School for one year as a freshman before transferring to JSerra Catholic High School in nearby San Juan Capistrano but did not play for the school.

Rodman initially committed to play collegiate soccer for the UCLA Bruins before deciding to follow her older brother to the Washington State Cougars. She never played a match in college, however, as her freshman season was cancelled due to the COVID-19 pandemic.

Club career 
Rodman decided to turn professional before ever playing a match in college. At age 18, she became the youngest player to be drafted in NWSL history when the Washington Spirit selected her as their first draft pick (second overall) at the 2021 NWSL College Draft. Prior to being drafted by the Spirit, Rodman had never been to Washington DC.

On April 10, 2021, Rodman made her professional debut during a 2021 NWSL Challenge Cup match, scoring a goal within five minutes of being subbed on. Rodman competed in all four of the Spirit's matches during the Challenge Cup. She served an assist to the game-winning goal scored by Ashley Sanchez during the team's 1–0 win against Racing Louisville FC on April 15. The Spirit finished in fourth place in the East Division with a  record.

During the 2021 NWSL season, Rodman was the Spirit's second-highest scorer with seven goals. The team finished in third place during the regular season with a  record and advanced to the Playoffs. After the Spirit defeated North Carolina Courage 1–0, Rodman scored in the Spirit's 2–1 win against OL Reign to advance to the Final where they faced Chicago Red Stars. Rodman helped lift the Spirit to their first league championship with an assist on the game-winning goal scored by Kelley O'Hara. At age 19, Rodman became the youngest player in league history to record an assist in the playoffs.

On November 17, 2021, Rodman was named NWSL Rookie of the Year and to the NWSL Best XI. She earned U.S. Soccer Young Female Player of the Year honors the following month. On February 2, 2022, Rodman signed a contract extension with the Washington Spirit running until after the 2024 season, with an option for 2025. It was reported that the new contract was worth $1.1 million, making Rodman the highest paid player in NWSL history.

On August 13, 2022, Rodman was nominated for the Ballon d'Or Féminin.

International career
Rodman has represented the United States on the senior, under-20, and under-17 national teams. She competed at the 2018 FIFA U-17 Women's World Cup in Uruguay where she played 165 minutes and notched one assist. In 2020, she scored nine goals and helped the United States win the 2020 CONCACAF Women's U-20 Championship. She was nominated for the U.S. Soccer Young Female Player of the Year award the same year, but did not win. She won the award in 2021.

In January 2022, Rodman was named to the senior national team's camp for the first time ahead of the 2022 SheBelieves Cup. She made her national team debut on February 17, 2022, in a 0–0 draw with Czech Republic at the tournament, and scored her first goal on April 12, 2022, in a friendly against Uzbekistan, in her third national team appearance. In June 2022, Rodman was named to the U.S. roster for the 2022 CONCACAF W Championship team.

Other work
Rodman is the author of a children's book, entitled Wake Up and Kick It.

Career statistics

Club

International

Honors
Washington Spirit
 NWSL Championship: 2021
United States

 CONCACAF Women's Championship: 2022

 SheBelieves Cup: 2022, 2023
Individual
 NWSL Rookie of the Year: 2021
 NWSL Best XI: 2021
 U.S. Soccer Young Female Player of the Year: 2021

References

External links

 
 Washington State Cougars player profile

2002 births
Living people
Soccer players from California
American women's soccer players
Washington Spirit players
National Women's Soccer League players
United States women's under-20 international soccer players
United States women's international soccer players
Women's association football forwards
Washington Spirit draft picks
Sportspeople from Newport Beach, California
African-American women's soccer players
21st-century African-American women
Adidas people